U Make Ai Dream is a song performed the J-pop singer, Kotoko and be composed and arranged by the I've Sound founder, Kazuya Takase. Although released as a maxi single, this single does not contain a B-side but instead contains the karaoke and instrumental version of the title track. This single contains the theme song for the MMO game Ai Sp@ce.

The single's catalog number is GNCA-7921

Track listing 
U Make Ai Dream / U make 愛 dream
Lyrics: Kotoko
Composition/Arrangement: Kazuya Takase
U Make Ai Dream: Karaoke
U Make Ai Dream: Instrumental

References

2008 singles
Kotoko (singer) songs
2008 songs